Huang Zhi Yu (born December 24, 1979) is a Chinese Grand Prix motorcycle racer.

Career statistics

By season

Races by year
(key)

References

External links
http://www.motogp.com/en/riders/Zhi+Yu+Huang

1979 births
Living people
Chinese motorcycle racers
250cc World Championship riders